Khangarh is a city in the Ghotki District of Pakistan's Sindh province.

The city is a center for sugarcane and cotton crops. It is one of the largest tehsils of the Ghotki District.

Cholistan Desert is mainly located in the Khangarh area.

References

Cities and towns in Ghotki District
Talukas of Sindh